Hosta venusta, the handsome plantain lily, is a species of flowering plant in the family Asparagaceae, native to Jeju Island of South Korea, with a few populations in central Japan. It may have arisen from Hosta minor populations isolated on Jeju since the last ice age. One of the smallest hostas, it cold hardy to USDA zone 3, shade tolerant, and is well suited for rock gardens, borders and as a ground cover.

References

venusta
Flora of South Korea
Flora of Japan
Plants described in 1935